Masonic Hall or Old Masonic Hall may refer to:

United States
Masonic Hall (Wickenburg, Arizona)
Old Masonic Hall (Benicia, California), in Solano County
Masonic Hall (Mendocino, California)
Grand Opera House (Wilmington, Delaware), also known as Masonic Hall and Grand Theater
Masonic Hall (Eastwood, Kentucky), in the Fisherville neighborhood of Louisville 
Masonic Hall-Federal Commissary Building, Smithland, Kentucky
Masonic Hall (Augusta, Maine)
Old Masonic Hall (Booneville, Mississippi)
Masonic Hall (Carrollton, Mississippi)
Masonic Hall (Gulfport, Mississippi)
Masonic Hall (Hazlehurst, Mississippi)
Masonic Hall (Lexington, Mississippi)
Masonic Hall (Long Beach, Mississippi)
Old Masonic Hall (Louisville, Mississippi)
Pelahatchie City Hall and Masonic Hall, Pelahatchie, Mississippi
Old Municipal Building and Masonic Hall, Shelby, Mississippi
Masonic Hall (Manhattan), in New York City
Masonic Hall (Waynesville, North Carolina)
Old Masonic Hall (Bellville, Texas), in Austin County
Masonic Hall (Farmington, Washington)

Other countries
Albany Masonic Hall, Australia
Rockhampton Masonic Hall, Australia
Townsville Masonic Hall, Australia
Yangan Masonic Hall, Australia
Masonic Hall, York, Australia
Masonic Hall (Whitewood, Saskatchewan), Canada
Cheltenham Masonic Hall, England
Masonic Hall, Sheringham, England
Masonic Hall, Taunton, England
Masonic Hall, Monmouth, Wales
Masonic Hall, Duncombe Place, in York, England

See also
List of Masonic buildings
Masonic Temple (disambiguation)
Masonic Lodge (disambiguation)
Masonic Building (disambiguation)